Edward Gierek (6 January 1913 – 29 July 2001) was a Polish Communist politician and de facto leader of Poland between 1970 and 1980. Gierek replaced Władysław Gomułka as First Secretary of the ruling Polish United Workers' Party (PZPR) in the Polish People's Republic in 1970. He is known for opening communist Poland to the Western Bloc and for his economic policies based on foreign loans. He was removed from power after labour strikes led to the Gdańsk Agreement between the communist state and workers of the emerging Solidarity free trade union movement.

Born in Sosnowiec, Congress Poland, to a devoutly Catholic family, Gierek emigrated with his relatives to France at a young age. In 1934, he was deported to Poland for communist advocacy and campaigning, but subsequently moved to Belgium to work as a coal miner in Genk. As a result, he was proficient in French, which benefited in pursuing his future political career. During the Second World War, Gierek was active in the Belgian Resistance against the Germans. He returned to post-war Poland only in 1948 after spending 22 years abroad. In 1954, he became part of the Central Committee of the Polish United Workers' Party (PZPR) under Bolesław Bierut as a representative of the Silesian region. Known for his openness and public speaking, Gierek gradually emerged as one of the most respected and progressive politicians in the country, whilst becoming a strong opponent to more authoritarian Władysław Gomułka.

Gomułka was removed from office after the 1970 Polish protests were violently suppressed on his authority. In December 1970, Gierek was appointed the new First Secretary and de facto leader of the Polish People's Republic. The first years of his term were marked by industrialization as well as the improvement of living and working conditions. Having spent time in Western Europe, he opened communist Poland to new Western ideas and loosened the censorship, thus turning Poland into the most liberal country of the Eastern Bloc. The large sums of money lent by foreign creditors were directed at constructing blocks of flats and at creating heavy steel and coal industries in his native Silesia. In 1976, Gierek opened the first fully-operational Polish highway from Warsaw to Katowice, which colloquially bears his name to this day. However, by the end of the 1970s Poland submerged into economic decline. The country was so heavily indebted that rationing was introduced due to shortages as the government was unable to pay off the loans. In 1980, he allowed for the Solidarity trade union to appear in accordance with the Gdańsk Agreement, which formed a basis for workers' rights. Seen as a radical move to renounce communism, Gierek was removed from office like his predecessor.

Despite dragging Poland into financial and economic decline, Edward Gierek is fondly remembered for his patriotism and modernization policies; over 1.8 million flats were constructed to house the growing population, and he is also responsible for initiating the production of Fiat 126 in Poland and the erection of Warszawa Centralna railway station, the most modern European station at the time of its completion in 1975. Numerous aphorisms and sayings were popularized under his term, in particular the ones referring to the food shortages were later promoted by Ronald Reagan.

Youth and early career

Edward Gierek was born in Porąbka, now part of Sosnowiec, into a coal mining family. He lost his father to a mining accident in a pit at the age of four. His mother remarried and emigrated to northern France, where he lived from the age of 10 and worked in a coal mine from the age of 13. Gierek joined the French Communist Party in 1931 and in 1934 was deported to Poland for organizing a strike. After completing compulsory military service in Stryi in southeastern Poland (1934–1936), Gierek married Stanisława Jędrusik, but was unable to find employment. The Giereks went to Belgium, where Edward worked in the coal mines of Waterschei, contracting pneumoconiosis (black lung disease) in the process. In 1939 Gierek joined the Communist Party of Belgium. During the German occupation, he participated in communist anti-Nazi Belgian resistance activities. After the war Gierek remained politically active among the Polish immigrant community. He was a co-founder of the Belgian branch of the Polish Workers' Party (PPR) and a chairman of the National Council of Poles in Belgium.

Polish United Workers' Party activist

                                                                                         
Gierek, who in 1948 was 35 and had spent 22 years abroad, was directed by the PPR authorities to return to Poland, which he did with his wife and their two sons. Working in the Katowice district PPR organization, in December 1948, as a Sosnowiec delegate he participated in the PPR-PPS unification congress, which resulted in the establishment of the Polish United Workers' Party (PZPR). In 1949, he was designated for and attended a two-year higher party course in Warsaw, where he was judged to be poorly qualified for intellectual endeavors but highly motivated for party work. In 1951 Roman Zambrowski sent Gierek to a striking coal mine, charging him with restoring order. Gierek was able to resolve the situation using persuasion and a use of force was avoided.  He was a member of the Sejm, Polish parliament, from 1952. During the II Congress of the PZPR (March 1954), he was elected a member of the party's Central Committee. As chief of the Central Committee's Heavy Industry Division, he worked directly under First Secretary Bolesław Bierut in Warsaw.

In March 1956, when Edward Ochab became the party's first secretary, Gierek became a secretary of the Central Committee, even though he publicly expressed doubts about his own qualifications. On 28 June 1956 he was sent to Poznań, where a workers' protest was taking place. Afterwards, delegated by the Politburo, he headed the commission charged with investigating the causes and course of the Poznań events. They presented their report on 7 July, blaming a hostile anti-socialist foreign inspired conspiracy that took advantage of worker discontent in Poznań enterprises. In July Gierek became a member of the PZPR Politburo, but lasted in that position only until October, when Władysław Gomułka replaced Ochab as first secretary. Nikita Khrushchev criticized Gomułka for not retaining Gierek in the Politburo; he remained a Central Committee secretary responsible for economic affairs, however. He would return to the Politburo in March 1959, at the III Congress of the PZPR.

Katowice industrial district leader

In March 1957, in addition to his Central Committee duties, Gierek became first secretary of the Katowice Voivodeship PZPR organization, and he kept this job until 1970. He created a personal power base in the Katowice region and became the nationally recognized leader of the young technocrat faction of the party. On the one hand Gierek was regarded as a pragmatic, non-ideological and economic progress-oriented manager, on the other he was known for his servile attitude toward the Soviet leaders, for whom he was a source of information concerning the PZPR and its personalities. Both the industrial supremacy of Gierek's well-run Upper Silesia territory and the special relationship with the Soviets he cultivated made many believe that Gierek was a likely successor to Gomułka.

The Warsaw University law professor Mieczysław Maneli who knew Gierek from 1960 onward wrote about him in 1971: "Edward Gierek is an old‐fashioned Communist, but without fanaticism or zealousness. His Marxism is encumbered by few dogmas. It is almost pragmatic. He believes profoundly in the leading role that history conferred upon Communist parties and lives by the maxim that a government should be strong and rule unshakably...Gierek's party nickname was “Tshombe,” and Silesia was the “Polish Katanga.” There he operated almost as a sovereign prince, a talented organizer with a real gift for finding efficient and loyal henchmen. All professions were represented in his court: engineers, economists, professors, writers, party apparatchiks and security agents".
                                                                                                          Gierek may have tried to make his move during the 1968 Polish political crisis. Soon after the student rally on 8 March in Warsaw, on 14 March in Katowice he led a mass gathering of 100,000 party members from the entire province. He was the first Politburo member to speak publicly on the issue of the protests then taking place and later claimed that his motivation was to demonstrate support for Gomułka's rule, threatened by Mieczysław Moczar's intra-party conspiring. Gierek used strong language to condemn the purported "enemies of People's Poland" who were "disturbing the peaceful Silesian water". He showered them with propaganda epithets and alluded to their bones being crushed if they persevered in their attempts to turn the "nation" away from its "chosen course." Gierek was supposedly embarrassed when participants of the party conference in Warsaw on 19 March shouted his name along with that of Gomułka, as an expression of support. The 1968 events strengthened Gierek's position, also in the eyes of his sponsors in Moscow.

First secretary of the PZPR

When the 1970 Polish protests were violently suppressed, Gierek replaced Gomułka as first secretary of the party and had thus become the most powerful politician in Poland. In late January 1971, he put his new authority on the line and traveled to Szczecin and Gdańsk, to bargain personally with the striking workers. Consumer price increases that triggered the recent revolt were rescinded. Among Gierek's popular moves was the decision to rebuild the Royal Castle in Warsaw, destroyed during World War II and not included in the post-war restoration of the city's Old Town. State controlled media stressed his foreign upbringing and his fluency in the French language.

The arrival of the Gierek team meant the final generational replacement of the ruling communist elite, a process begun in 1968 under Gomułka. Many thousands of party activists, including important elder leaders with background in the prewar Communist Party of Poland, were removed from positions of responsibility and replaced with people whose careers formed after World War II. Much of the overhaul was accomplished during and after the VI Congress of the PZPR, convened in December 1971. The resulting governing class was one of the youngest in Europe. The role of the administration was expanded at the expense of the party, according to the maxim "the party leads, the government governs". Throughout the 1970s, the most highly visible member of the top leadership after Gierek was Prime Minister Piotr Jaroszewicz. From May 1971, Gierek's rival party politician Mieczysław Moczar was increasingly marginalized.

According to historian Krzysztof Pomian, early in his term Gierek abandoned the regime's long-standing practice of on-and-off confrontation with the Polish Catholic Church, and opted for cooperation. The policy resulted in a privileged position of the Church and its leaders for the duration of the communist rule in Poland. The Church markedly expanded its physical infrastructure and also became a crucial political third force, often involved in mediating conflict between the authorities and opposition activists.

Economic expansion and decline

Since the riots that brought down Gomułka were caused primarily by economic difficulties, Gierek promised economic reform and instituted a program to modernize industry and increase the availability of consumer goods. His "reform" was based primarily on large scale foreign borrowing, not accompanied by major systemic restructuring. The need for deeper reform was obscured by the investment boom the country was enjoying in the first half of the 1970s. The first secretary's good relations with Western leaders, especially France's Valéry Giscard d'Estaing and West Germany's Helmut Schmidt, were a catalyst for his receiving foreign aid and loans. Gierek is widely credited with opening Poland to political and economic influence from the Western Bloc. He himself extensively traveled abroad and received important foreign guests in Poland, including three presidents of the United States. Gierek also was trusted by Leonid Brezhnev, which meant that he was able to pursue his policies (globalization of Poland's economy) without much Soviet interference. He had readily granted the Soviets concessions that his predecessor Gomułka would consider contrary to the Polish national interest.

Standard of living increased markedly in Poland in the first half of the 1970s, and for a time Gierek was hailed as a miracle-worker. Poles, to an unprecedented degree, were able to purchase desired consumer items such as compact cars, travel to the West rather freely, and even a solution to the intractable housing supply problem seemed to be on the horizon. Decades later many remembered the period as the most prosperous in their lives. The economy, however, began to falter during the 1973 oil crisis, and by 1976 price increases became necessary. The June 1976 protests were brutally suppressed by police, but the planned price increases were canceled. The greatest accumulation of foreign debt occurred in the late 1970s, as the regime struggled to counter the effects of the crisis.

Crisis, protests, organized opposition

The period of Gierek's rule is notable for the rise of organized opposition in Poland. Changes in the constitution, proposed by the regime, caused considerable controversy at the turn of 1975 and 1976. The intended amendments included formalizing the "socialist character of the state", the leading role of the PZPR and the Polish-Soviet alliance. The widely opposed alterations resulted in numerous protest letters and other actions, but were supported at the VII Congress of the PZPR in December 1975 and largely implemented by the Sejm in February 1976. Organized opposition circles developed gradually and reached 3000–4000 members by the end of the decade.

Because of the deteriorating economic situation, at the end of 1975 the authorities announced that the 1971 freeze in food prices would have to be lifted. Prime Minister Jaroszewicz forced the price rises, in combination with financial compensation favoring upper income brackets; the policy ultimately was adopted despite strong objections voiced by the Soviet leadership. The increase, supported by Gierek, was announced by Jaroszewicz in the Sejm on 24 June 1976. Strikes broke out the following day, with particularly serious disturbances, brutally suppressed by police, taking place in Radom, at Warsaw's Ursus Factory and in Płock. On 26 June, Gierek engaged in the traditional party crisis-confronting mode of operation, ordering mass public gatherings in Polish cities to demonstrate people's supposed support for the party and condemn the "trouble makers".

Ordered by Brezhnev not to attempt any further manipulations with prices, Gierek and his government undertook other measures to rescue the market destabilized in the summer of 1976. In August, sugar "merchandise coupons" were introduced to ration the product. The politics of "dynamic development" was over, as evidenced by such ration cards, which would remain a part of Poland's daily reality until July 1989.

In the aftermath of the June 1976 protests, a major opposition group, the Workers' Defence Committee (KOR), commenced its activities in September to help the persecuted worker protest participants. Other opposition organizations were also established in 1977–79, but historically the KOR proved to be of particular importance.
 
In 1979, Poland's ruling communists reluctantly allowed Pope John Paul II to make his first papal visit to Poland (2–10 June), despite Soviet advice to the contrary. Gierek, who had previously met Pope Paul VI at the Vatican, talked with the Pope on the occasion of his visit.

Downfall

Although Gierek, distressed by the 1976 price increase policy failure, was persuaded by his colleagues not to resign, divisions within his team intensified. One faction, led by Edward Babiuch and Piotr Jaroszewicz, wanted him to remain at the helm, while another, led by Stanisław Kania and Wojciech Jaruzelski, was less interested in preserving his leadership.

In May 1980, after the Soviet invasion of Afghanistan and the subsequent Western boycott of the Soviet Union, Gierek arranged a meeting between Valéry Giscard d'Estaing and Leonid Brezhnev in Warsaw. As was the case with Władysław Gomułka a decade earlier, a foreign policy success created an illusion that the Polish party leader was secure in his statesman aura, while the paramount political facts were being determined by the deteriorating economic situation and the resultant labor unrest. In July Gierek went to the Crimea, his usual vacation spot. For the last time he talked there with his friend Brezhnev. He responded to Brezhnev's gloomy assessment of the situation in Poland (including the out-of-control indebtedness) with his own upbeat predictions, possibly not fully cognizant of the country's, and his own, predicament.

High foreign debts, food shortages, and an outmoded industrial base were among the factors that forced a new round of economic reforms. Once again, in the summer of 1980 price increases set off protests across the country, especially in the Gdańsk and Szczecin shipyards. Unlike on previous occasions, the regime decided not to resort to force to suppress the strikes. In the Gdańsk Agreement and other accords reached with Polish workers, Gierek was forced to concede their right to strike, and the Solidarity labor union was born.

Shortly thereafter, in early September 1980, he was replaced by the Central Committee's VI Plenum as party first secretary by Stanisław Kania and removed from power. A popular and trusted leader in the early 1970s, Gierek left surrounded by infamy and ridicule, deserted by most of his collaborators. The VII Plenum in December 1980 held Gierek and Jaroszewicz personally liable for the situation in the country and removed them from the Central Committee. The extraordinary IX Congress of the PZPR, in an unprecedented move, voted in July 1981 to expel Gierek and his close associates from the party, as the delegates considered them responsible for the Solidarity-related crisis in Poland, and First Secretary Kania was unable to prevent their action. The next first secretary of the PZPR, General Wojciech Jaruzelski, introduced martial law in Poland on 13 December 1981. Gierek was interned for a year from December 1981. Unlike the (also-interned) opposition activists, the internment status brought Gierek no social respect. He ended his political career as the era's main pariah.

Edward Gierek died in July 2001 of the miner's lung illness in a hospital in Cieszyn, near the southern mountain resort of Ustroń where he spent his last years. From the perspective of time his rule was now seen in a more positive light and over ten thousand people attended his funeral.

With his lifelong wife, Stanisława née Jędrusik, Gierek had two sons, one of whom is MEP Adam Gierek.

Legacy

In 1990 two books, based on extended interviews with Gierek by Janusz Rolicki, were published in Poland and became bestsellers.

Polish society is divided in its assessment of Gierek. His government is fondly remembered by some for the improved living standards the Poles enjoyed in the 1970s under his rule. Uniquely among the PZPR leaders, the Polish public has shown signs of Gierek nostalgia, discernible especially after the former first secretary's death.

Others emphasize that the improvements were only made possible by the unwise and unsustainable policies based on huge foreign loans, which led directly to the economic crises of the 1970s and 1980s. Judged by hindsight, the total sum of over 24 billion borrowed (in 1970s dollars) was not well-spent.

Upon becoming first secretary in December 1970, Gierek promised himself that under his watch people would not be shot on streets. In 1976 the security forces did intervene in strikes, but only after giving up their firearms. In 1980, they did not use force at all.

According to sociologist and left-wing politician Maciej Gdula, the social and cultural transformation that took place in Poland in the 1970s was even more fundamental than the one which occurred in the 1990s, following the political transition. Regarding the politics of alliance of the political and later also money elites with the middle class at the expense of the working class, he said "the general idea of the relationship of forces in our society has remained the same from the 1970s, and the period of mass solidarity was an exception" ("mass solidarity" being the years 1980–81). Since the time of Gierek, Polish society has been hegemonized by cultural perceptions and norms of the (at that time emerging) middle class. Terms like management, initiative, personality, or the individualistic maxim "get educated, work hard and get ahead in life", combined with orderliness, replaced class consciousness and the socialist egalitarian concept, as workers were losing their symbolic status, to be eventually separated into a marginalized stratum.

Decorations and awards
Poland

Foreign Awards

See also

 History of Poland (1945–89)

References

External links

 Edward Gierek, Polish Leader from Decade 1970–1980

1913 births
2001 deaths
People from Sosnowiec
People from Piotrków Governorate
French Communist Party members
Polish Workers' Party politicians
Members of the Politburo of the Polish United Workers' Party
Members of the Polish Sejm 1952–1956
Members of the Polish Sejm 1957–1961
Members of the Polish Sejm 1961–1965
Members of the Polish Sejm 1965–1969
Members of the Polish Sejm 1969–1972
Members of the Polish Sejm 1972–1976
Members of the Polish Sejm 1976–1980
Members of the Polish Sejm 1980–1985
Recipients of the Order of the Builders of People's Poland
Grand Collars of the Order of Prince Henry
Recipients of the Order of Lenin
Recipients of the Gold Cross of Merit (Poland)
Recipients of the Order of the Banner of Work
Grand Officiers of the Légion d'honneur